Samuel Campbell (born 29 September 1944) is an Australian former equestrian. He competed in two events at the 1968 Summer Olympics.

References

External links
 

1944 births
Living people
Australian male equestrians
Olympic equestrians of Australia
Equestrians at the 1968 Summer Olympics
People from New England (New South Wales)
Sportsmen from New South Wales
20th-century Australian people